Laissac is a former commune in the Aveyron department in southern France. On 1 January 2016, it was merged into the new commune of Laissac-Sévérac-l'Église. It is located by the river Aveyron and National Highway 88 between Lapanouse and Rodez.

Population

See also
Communes of the Aveyron department

References

Former communes of Aveyron
Aveyron communes articles needing translation from French Wikipedia
Populated places disestablished in 2016
Ruteni